Ralphton is an unincorporated community and coal town in Somerset County, Pennsylvania, United States. Quemahoning Coal Company operated at least 10 mines in Ralphton in 1918.

References

Unincorporated communities in Somerset County, Pennsylvania
Coal towns in Pennsylvania
Unincorporated communities in Pennsylvania